is a private music school based in Shibuya, Tokyo, Japan, which was founded in 1967.

Summary
The year is divided into two semesters. Lesson schedules are tailored to the individual, and school attendance is at the student's own pace and convenience. There is no credit system; after two years of attendance, students receive a graduation certificate. If a student wishes to continue their studies after you graduation, they can become a research student at any point after graduation.

Special Features
In the past, An Music School was established as an institution to retrain professionals but it now deals with a broad range of students from beginners to professionals. With individually tailored lesson programs, one-to-one teaching forms the main part of education at the school.

The age of students varies widely and many have jobs or are housewives. The student age bracket is high compared to other music schools because it's common for music college graduates to attend the An Music School.

Department

Vocal
Guitar
Piano
Keyboard
Bass
Drums
Arrangement
Saxophone-Flute

Notable alumni

This is an incomplete list of notable former students, in alphabetic order:
 Harumi Tsuyuzaki
 Hirotaka Izumi (former T-Square keyboardist) 
 Ichiko Hashimoto
 Kazumi Watanabe
 Masami Shiratama
 Naoki Itamura
 Rikiya Higashihara
 Shirō Sagisu
 Takeshi Kobayashi
 TAKUYA
 Tsuneo Imahori

References

 Official web site 
 An Music Group 

Educational institutions established in 1967
Universities and colleges in Tokyo
Private universities and colleges in Japan
Music schools in Japan
Shibuya
1967 establishments in Japan